The Association of Professional Schools of International Affairs (APSIA) is a non-profit educational organization of graduate schools of international affairs, with 40 members and 26 affiliates around the world. 

Starting as a network of American graduate schools in the mid-1970s, APSIA was incorporated in 1989 and grew into an international association, with member and affiliate schools in Asia, Europe, Latin America, and North America. It continues to help members transform professional education in international affairs and advance, thereby, international understanding, prosperity, peace, and national security.

APSIA alumni have gone on to work in a wide array of fields, with 12 actively in positions as heads of state and senior cabinet officials. Member schools have a 91% full time employment or PHD program placement rate shortly after graduation.

APSIA Schools
The Association of Professional Schools of International Affairs comprises 40 member schools and 27 affiliate member programs. Full members of APSIA have undergone a review process and meet qualifications required for full APSIA membership. Affiliate members undergo a similar review process and meet some but not all of the full membership requirements.

Requirements for membership include:

 A commitment to graduate professional training
 An educational program of high academic quality
 At least three classes graduated from its two year master's degree program
 A substantial and demonstrated commitment to the study of international affairs
 At least one master's degree program requiring two years of academic coursework to complete
 Significant autonomy within a major university

The member schools of the APSIA are the primary sources of education for international affairs professionals in their respective countries. These schools provide multidisciplinary, policy-oriented, intercultural studies.

Degree Programs
All APSIA schools offer two-year master's degree programs, though both shorter and longer program offerings exist. Member schools may also have doctorate programs. Degrees offered cover international relations, public policy, and the world's countries and cultures. Students gain skills in economics, policy analysis, management, communications, and foreign languages.  

Many APSIA schools offer joint and dual-degree programs that combine the study of international affairs with such fields as law, business, public policy, environmental studies, social work and public health. Certificates and career track specialization can also be found at our member schools.

Students

Most students at APSIA schools have studied, worked or traveled overseas.  Over half of recently enrolled students are women, and 40 percent are nationals of countries other than the school's. 80% of Pickering and Rangel fellows choose APSIA schools, and programs consistently produce Boren and US Presidential Management fellows.

Faculty

Through their research, writing, teaching and media commentaries, APSIA faculty members contribute to international affairs scholarship.

Special Programs

Midcareer and non-degree programs are open to diplomats, government officials, journalists and other professionals interested in further academic training. APSIA schools sponsor a variety of conferences and seminars on foreign policy issues.

Student Fellowships
Harold W. Rosenthal Fellowship in International Relations

The Fellowship provides graduate students at APSIA member schools the opportunity to spend a summer working on foreign affairs issues at a U.S. federal government agency or department. Established in 1977 in memory of Harold Wallace Rosenthal, a US Congressional staffer and victim of international terrorism while on official duty, the Program had hosted 155 Fellows . The European Union Visitors Program (EVP) has selected a minimum of one Rosenthal Fellow every year as an "EVP" Fellow since the inception of the program.

Fellows are selected based on their commitment to public service, education, interest in international relations, and experience.

Run in association with APSIA, the Rosenthal Fellowship receives support from a number of individual donors as well as the Rotary Foundation. It formerly received support from the Rockefeller Brothers Fund. Fellows are current graduate students in international affairs of any nationality nominated by their schools.

Japan Travel Program for U.S. Future Leaders

The Japan Travel Program allows US graduate students interested in Japan, the U.S.-Japan relationship, and public service to spend ten days in Japan. Program Fellows meet with experts and leaders from the business, government, non-profit, and policy sectors. Participants also engage in self-organized research activities in such areas as international economics, foreign policy, public diplomacy, national security, and environmental sustainability. They make excursions to historical and cultural Japanese sites.

The Fellows are graduate students from U.S.-based APSIA member schools who have been chosen through a highly competitive selection process. Students are nominated by their school (up to two nominations per school), with the final selection carried out by the Center for Global Partnership (CGP) in conjunction with APSIA.

Public Policy & International Affairs Fellowship Program

The Public Policy & International Affairs(PPIA)  Fellowship Program provides undergraduates from traditionally underrepresented groups with the skills to be strong applicants to graduate schools of public and international affairs. APSIA became an institutional sponsor of the program in 2004 and continues to support their mission. Programs under PPIA include the Junior Summer Institute, a Graduate School Consortium and Public Service Weekends.

Fellowship Board
APSIA works to connect students with scholarships and fellowships to help fund their studies. A fellowship board provides students at all levels one location for funding opportunities specific to their field.

Employer Resources
APSIA serves as both a resource for employers who are looking to post job opportunities for students with an international affairs background and for students who are looking for career opportunities. The APSIA job board posts current content for internships through senior professionals posted by organizations and member schools. Employers can directly contact APSIA member schools' career services staff through the online directory, participate in speaking events with current graduate students, and can request a pool of prospective candidates.

Member Schools
School of International Service, American University
Norman Paterson School of International Affairs, Carleton University
School of International and Public Affairs, Columbia University
Sanford School of Public Policy, Duke University
Steven J. Green School of International and Public Affairs, Florida International University
Elliott School of International Affairs, George Washington University
Edmund A. Walsh School of Foreign Service, Georgetown University
Sam Nunn School of International Affairs, Georgia Institute of Technology
Graduate Institute of International and Development Studies of Geneva (IHEID)
John F. Kennedy School of Government, Harvard University
Hertie School
 School of Global and Public Affairs, IE University
Paul H. Nitze School of Advanced International Studies, Johns Hopkins University
Graduate School of International Studies, Korea University
Moscow State Institute of International Relations (MGIMO)
Lee Kuan Yew School of Public Policy, National University of Singapore
Penn State School of International Affairs, Pennsylvania State University  
School of Public and International Affairs, Princeton University
Graduate School of International Relations, Ritsumeikan University
Paris School of International Affairs, Sciences Po (formally known as Institut d'Études Politiques de Paris)
Graduate School of International Studies, Seoul National University
Freeman Spogli Institute for International Studies, Stanford University
Stockholm School of Economics
Maxwell School of Citizenship and Public Affairs, Syracuse University
The Bush School of Government and Public Service, Texas A&M University
The Fletcher School of Law and Diplomacy, Tufts University
School of Global Policy and Strategy, University of California, San Diego
Josef Korbel School of International Studies, University of Denver
School of Public Policy, University of Maryland
Gerald R. Ford School of Public Policy, University of Michigan
Hubert H. Humphrey School of Public Affairs, University of Minnesota
University of Pittsburgh Graduate School of Public and International Affairs, University of Pittsburgh
Master of Public Diplomacy, University of Southern California
Master International Affairs and Governance, University of St. Gallen
Lyndon B. Johnson School of Public Affairs, The University of Texas at Austin
Munk School of Global Affairs and Public Policy, University of Toronto
Henry M. Jackson School of International Studies, University of Washington
Yale Jackson School of Global Affairs, Yale University
Graduate School of International Studies, Yonsei University

Affiliate Member Schools
Balsille School of International Affairs, University of Waterloo 
Robert F. Wagner School of Public Service, New York University
Pardee School of Global Studies, Boston University
Master of International Relations, Monash University
S. Rajaratnam School of International Studies, Nanyang Technological University
College of International Affairs, National Chengchi University
International Organizations MBA, University of Geneva
Institute for Politics and Strategy, Carnegie Mellon University
School of Public and International Affairs, Azerbaijan Diplomatic Academy
Thunderbird School of Global Management, Arizona State University
The Heller School for Social Policy and Management, Brandeis University
International Studies Program, DePaul University
Diplomatic Academy of Vienna, Vienna School of International Studies
Graduate Program in International Political Economy and Development, Fordham University
Schar School of Policy and Government, George Mason University
Institut Barcelona d'Estudis Internacionals (IBEI)
Graduate School of International Relations, International University of Japan
School of Public and International Affairs, North Carolina State University
School of Public Policy, Pepperdine University
Jan Masaryk Centre for International Studies, Prague University of Economics and Business
School of Diplomacy and International Relations, Seton Hall University
Facultad de Finanzas, Gobierno y Relaciones Internacionales, Universidad Externado de Colombia
School of Public and International Affairs, University of Georgia
Master of Arts in International Administration, University of Miami
Department of International Studies, University of Oregon
School of International Studies, University of Trento
Graduate School of International Studies, Utsunomiya University
Graduate School of Asia-Pacific Studies, Waseda University
Public Policy Program, William & Mary

References

External links
APSIA

Schools of international relations
Public administration schools
Organizations established in 1989